Open Fire may refer to:

Film and TV
 Open Fire (1994 film), a 1994 British television film based on the shooting of Stephen Waldorf
 Open Fire (1989 film), an American action film
 Open Fire, a 1994 film with Jeff Wincott

Music
 Open Fire (Ronnie Montrose album), 1978
 Open Fire (Y&T album), 1985
 Open Fire (Alabama Thunderpussy album), 2007
 Open Fire, a 2011 album by Leehom Wang
 "Open Fire", a 1994 song by Gotthard from Dial Hard
 "Open Fire", a 2003 song by Krokus from Rock the Block
 "Open Fire", a 2015 song by The Darkness from Last of Our Kind

Other uses
 Open Fire (horse) (1961–1980), American Thoroughbred champion racehorse
 Openfire, an XMPP server (formerly known as Wildfire)